Amos Kilbourne (1881–1940) was an English professional footballer who played as an inside forward.

References

1881 births
1940 deaths
People from Long Eaton
Footballers from Derbyshire
English footballers
Association football inside forwards
Sawley Rangers F.C. players
Bury F.C. players
Grimsby Town F.C. players
English Football League players